Chengbei Subdistrict is a subdistrict of Fu'an in northeastern Fujian, People's Republic of China, occupying the northern portion of the urban area of Fu'an as suggested by its name. , it has 8 residential communities under its administration.

See also 
 List of township-level divisions of Fujian

References 

Township-level divisions of Fujian